Coccolysin (Streptococcus thermophilus intracellular proteinase, EM 19000) is an enzyme. This enzyme catalyses the following chemical reaction

 Preferential cleavage: -Leu, -Phe, -Tyr, -Ala

This endopeptidase is present in S. thermophilus and S. diacetilactis and S. faecalis.

References

External links 
 

EC 3.4.24